Yevgeni Vladimirovich Gerasimov (born 25 February 1951) is a Soviet and Russian theater and film actor, film director, people's artist of the Russian Federation (1994) and a Moscow City Duma deputy from the United Russia party.

He is most known for his part in the television series Guest from the Future.

References

External links
 

1951 births
Living people
Soviet male film actors
Soviet film directors
Russian male film actors
Russian film directors
People's Artists of Russia
United Russia politicians
Russian actor-politicians
Deputies of Moscow City Duma
Honorary Members of the Russian Academy of Arts
Recipients of the Order "For Merit to the Fatherland", 4th class
Recipients of the Order "For Merit to the Fatherland", 3rd class
Soviet male child actors
Male actors from Moscow